Young Pioneers may refer to:

Media
 Young Pioneers (novel), a short novel by Rose Wilder Lane
 Young Pioneers (film), a 1976 American made-for-television Western film
 Young Pioneers' Christmas, a 1976 American made-for-television Western drama film
 The Young Pioneers (miniseries), a three-episode ABC western television series
 (Young) Pioneers, an American folk punk band from Richmond, Virginia

Organizations
 Malawi Young Pioneers, the paramilitary wing of the Malawi Congress Party
 Pioneer movement, an organization for children operated by a communist party
 Pioneers Palace, youth centers designated for the creative work, sport training and extracurricular activities of Young Pioneers
 Vladimir Lenin All-Union Pioneer Organization, a mass youth organization of the Soviet Union for children
 Young Pioneer camp, vacation or summer camps of Young Pioneers
 Young Pioneers of America, a children's organization affiliated with the Communist Party USA
 Young Pioneers of China, a mass youth organization for children aged six to fourteen in the People's Republic of China
 Young Pioneers, a branch of the Ernst Thälmann Pioneer Organisation in East Germany.

Other
 Young Pioneers Stadium, a sports complex built in the Soviet Union